Alfred Senier (24 January 1853 – 29 June 1918) was a chemist and a Professor of Chemistry, Queen's College, Galway from 1891 until his death.  He was one of the founding members of the Aristotelian Society.

Life  
Alfred Senier was born 24 January 1853 in Burnley, England to Alfred Senier (1823–1893) and Jane. His father, who was born in England, first emigrated to the Territory of Wisconsin in 1844 before returning to England in 1847 to become a pharmacist. He married Jane Sutherland and, in 1853, emigrated once more to Wisconsin, opening a pharmacy in Dover. In 1857, they moved to the nearby village of Mazomanie.

He attended the University of Wisconsin and graduated from the University of Michigan in 1873 as a Doctor of Medicine.

He died 29 June 1918 at the age of 65 in Galway, Ireland.

References

Further reading 
 

1853 births
1918 deaths
Academics of the University of Galway
Irish chemists